The White Album is a double album and the third studio album released by Donnie Vie.

Track listing

Disc 1 
 "I Wanna Do It To You"
 "Handy Dandy"
 "For Your Pleasure"
 "Happy Days"
 "Crash And Burn"
 "Light Shine On"
 "Better Love Next Time"
 "My Love"
 "When Will You Love Me Again"
 "Haunted"
 "Unforsaken"

Disc 2 
 "25 Or 6 To 4  (Chicago Cover)" 
 "You're My Favorite Thing To Do"
 "Almost Home"
 "Imagine (John Lennon Cover)"
 "Angel Eyes (Outtake)"
 "Without You (Outtake)"
 "Big Brother"
 "Freaky Deaky"

References 

2014 albums
Donnie Vie albums